Brian Keith (1921–1997) was an American actor.

Brian or Bryan Keith may also refer to:

Brian Keith (judge) (born 1944), British judge
Bryan Keith, singer

See also